Runaway is the ninth studio album by English singer-songwriter Passenger. It was released on 31 August 2018 on Black Crow Records. The album peaked at number 6 on the UK Albums Chart.

Track listing
All tracks written by Mike Rosenberg.

Charts

Weekly charts

Year-end charts

Release history

References

2018 albums
Passenger (singer) albums